Auron is a ski resort with  of ski runs, at an elevation of  to , in the French alps in the Alpes-Maritimes department. It is located above the Tinée Valley near the town of Saint-Étienne-de-Tinée. The resort is part of the Stations du Mercantour group, along with Isola 2000 and St. Dalmas.

Piste and Lift Facilities
Auron has a total of 43 runs (as of December 2015), including 3 green runs, 16 blue runs, 15 red runs and 9 black runs. In total there is 135 km of piste for skiing and snowboarding.

Auron currently has 3 gondola lifts, 9 chairlifts, 3 button lifts and one rope lift for beginners. The lift capacity is about 21,000 people per hour.

Auron has downhill racing facilities, and a snow park.

The resort is equipped with snow cannons, and the pistes are maintained constantly by piste bashers.

The resort is a favourite with celebrities and the wealthy who live on the Riviera.

External links

Ski stations in France
Tourist attractions in Alpes-Maritimes
Sports venues in Alpes-Maritimes
Skiing in the Maritime Alps